Weizhu Bao (born September 1969 in Shaanxi, China) is a Chinese mathematician at the National University of Singapore (NUS). He is known for his work in applied mathematics with applications in quantum physics and chemistry and materials science, especially Bose-Einstein condensation (BEC) and highly oscillatory partial differential equations.

Biography

Bao was born in Xunyang County, Shaanxi Province, China. He completed his undergraduate studies in the Department of Mathematics at Tsinghua University in 1992 and obtained his master's degree and Ph.D. degree under the advice of Houde Han in the Department of Mathematical Sciences at Tsinghua University in 1995. He was subsequently a faculty member at Tsinghua University (1995-2000) with various visiting positions at Imperial College (1996 — 1997), Georgia Institute of Technology (1998 — 2000) and University of Wisconsin at Madison (Sept—Dec, 2000) during the period. He joined the National University of Singapore as an assistant professor in 2001 and became a full professor in 2009.

Contributions

Bao has made contributions to Bose-Einstein condensation (BEC), multiscale methods, computational quantum physics and chemistry, computational fluid dynamics, and computational materials science. In the study of BEC, he and collaborators have established mathematical theory and proposed efficient and accurate computational methods. For highly oscillatory partial differential equations, he and collaborators have developed the uniformly accurate multiscale time integrator method. For solid-state dewetting, he and collaborators have derived sharp interface and phase field models.

Selected works

Awards and honours

The honors that Bao has received include Beijing Science and Technology Award (together with Houde Han etc.) in 2003 and the Feng Kang Prize in Scientific Computing in 2013.  He was also an invited speaker at the International Congress of Mathematicians (ICM) in 2014 (Mathematics in Science and Technology section), and at the conference Dynamics, Equations and Applications in Kraków in 2019. He was named a Fellow of the American Mathematical Society, in the 2022 class of fellows, "for contributions to numerical analysis, in particular the numerical solution of partial differential equations and their applications", and as a Fellow of the Society for Industrial and Applied Mathematics, in the 2022 Class of SIAM Fellows, "for modeling and simulation for Bose-Einstein condensation and multiscale methods and analysis for highly oscillatory dispersive PDEs".

References

1969 births
Living people
Academic staff of the National University of Singapore
Tsinghua University alumni
21st-century Chinese mathematicians
Mathematicians from Shaanxi
People from Ankang
Educators from Shaanxi
Fellows of the American Mathematical Society
Fellows of the Society for Industrial and Applied Mathematics